Vertigo hebardi is a species of minute land snail, a terrestrial pulmonate gastropod mollusk or micromollusk in the family Vertiginidae, the whorl snails. This species is endemic to the United States.

Description
(Original description) The umbilicate shell is rather short. It is oval; very small, fragile and corneous. The shell contains 3½ convex whorls 3. The first one is smooth, the penultimate irregularly striate. The body whorl shows a few growth striae. The aperture is semiovate and is provided with five teeth. The parietal lamella are very high and long. The angular lamella is much lower and shorter than the parietal, the columellar very strong and directed downward. The two palatals are high and short. There is no crest behind the outer lip.

References 

 Nekola, J. C. and G. Rosenberg. (2013). Vertigo marciae (Gastropoda: Vertiginidae), a new land snail from Jamaica. Nautilus. 127(3): 107–114.

External links
 Clapp, G. H. (1920). Vertigo ovata and V. hebardi in Florida. The Nautilus. 33(4): 141

Molluscs of the United States
hebardi
Gastropods described in 1912